East Sister Island is a 15 hectare island in Ontario, Canada, located within Lake Erie. It has no long-term human population and is maintained as a Provincial Nature Reserve.

The island is part of the Pelee Archipelago which also includes West Sister Island (in Ohio, USA) and Middle Sister Island.

Flora and fauna
The island has become the home of a breeding colony of double-crested cormorants. Their droppings have threatened the forest, a relict of Carolinian forest in southern Ontario. The forests of the island are dominated by the common hackberry and Kentucky coffeetree. Unusual species on the island include the wild hyacinth and the Lake Erie water snake,  Nerodia sipedon insularum.

References

Landforms of Essex County, Ontario
Uninhabited islands of Ontario
Nature reserves in Ontario
Islands of Lake Erie in Ontario
Protected areas of Essex County, Ontario
Lake islands of Ontario